Bharatiya Kisan Union Arajnaitik (abbreviated BKUA) (English: Indian Farmers' Union) is a farmer's representative organisation in India.The organization was formed on 15 May 2022 in Lucknow, Uttar Pradesh, whose president was appointed Rajesh Singh Chauhan.

History 
In Uttar Pradesh, on the occasion of the death anniversary of Mahendra Singh Tikait, the leader of the farmers' movement and organization in North India, there was a split in the Bharatiya Kisan Union. Many farmer leaders associated with the Bharatiya Kisan Union of Naresh Tikait and Rakesh Tikait have separated and formed a new organization Bharatiya Kisan Union Arajnaitik.

See also 
Bharatiya Kisan Union
Narmada Bachao Andolan
All India Kisan Sabha

References

External links 
 Official Website

Farmers' organizations
Rural community development
Agricultural organisations based in India
Organisers of 2020–2021 Indian farmers' protest